The Jeanneau Yachts 64, also called the Jeanneau 64, is a French sailboat that was designed as a blue water cruiser. The hull was designed by Philippe Briand, the interior by Andrew Winch, with finishing by the Jeanneau Design Office. It was first built in 2015.

The design was replaced in production in 2022 by the Jeanneau Yachts 65.

Production
The design was built by Jeanneau in France, from 2015 to 2021 with over 70 boats built, but it is now out of production.

Design
The Jeanneau Yachts 64 is a recreational keelboat, built predominantly of polyester fiberglass, with wood trim. The primary construction uses a vacuum infused vinylester-balsa sandwich. It has a 9/10 fractional sloop rig, with a keel-stepped mast, three sets of swept spreaders and aluminum spars with discontinuous Dyform rigging. The hull has a plumb stem, a reverse transom with a fold-down tailgate-style swimming platform, an internally mounted spade-type rudder controlled by dual wheels and a fixed "L"-shaped fin keel with a weighted bulb, or optional shoal-draft keel. Features include a stern dinghy garage and the mainsheet mounted on a fiberglass arch. The fin keel model displaces  empty and carries  of cast iron ballast, while the shoal-draft version displaces  empty and carries  of cast iron ballast.

The design has sleeping accommodation for six people, with a double island berth in the bow cabin, a "U"-shaped settee and a straight settee in the main cabin and two aft cabins, one with a double berth on the starboard side and one with two singles to port. The galley is located on the port side just forward of the companionway ladder. The galley is "L"-shaped and is equipped with a stove, a  refrigerator/freezer and a double sink. A navigation station is opposite the galley, on the starboard side. There are three heads, one just forward of the bow cabin and two aft.

Operational history
The boat is supported by a class club, the Jeanneau Owners Network.

In a 2015 review for Yachting World, Belinda Bird wrote, "here is a yacht guaranteed to surprise. Packed within this 64ft 1in hull, the latest from Jeanneau, are a multitude of qualities that will make you question your preconceptions about the brand. The French production builder has married the world of big-boat luxury and comfort with production boat functionality and pricing to create a new market."

See also
List of sailing boat types

References

External links

Keelboats
2010s sailboat type designs
Sailing yachts
Sailboat type designs by Philippe Briand
Sailboat type designs by Andrew Winch
Sailboat type designs by Jeanneau Design Office
Sailboat types built by Jeanneau